Barbara Britch (born March 30, 1951) is an American cross-country skier. She competed in two events at the 1972 Winter Olympics.

References

External links
 

1951 births
Living people
American female cross-country skiers
Olympic cross-country skiers of the United States
Cross-country skiers at the 1972 Winter Olympics
Sportspeople from Anchorage, Alaska
21st-century American women